"Sweet Summer" is a song written by Neil Thrasher and Michael Dulaney, and recorded by American country musicgroup Diamond Rio. It was released in May 2001 as the third single from the album One More Day. It peaked at No. 18 in the United States and it also peaked at No. 4 on the U.S. Billboard Bubbling Under Hot 100.

Content
In the song, the narrator recollects previous memories from the summertime. He paints a portrait of the joys of summer by talking about different summer items from an ice cream man to backyard barbecues.

Critical reception
Deborah Evans Price, of Billboard magazine reviewed the song favorably calling it "the perfect summertime hit." Price also went on to say that Diamond Rio delivers the song in a "sweet, whimsical tone."

Chart performance
"Sweet Summer" debuted at number 55 on the U.S. Billboard Hot Country Singles & Tracks for the chart week of May 12, 2001.

References 

2001 singles
2001 songs
Diamond Rio songs
Songs written by Neil Thrasher
Arista Nashville singles
Songs written by Michael Dulaney